Charles Edouard Chamberland (12 March 1851 – 2 May 1908) was a French microbiologist from Chilly-le-Vignoble in the department of Jura who worked with Louis Pasteur.

In 1884 he developed a type of filtration known today as the Chamberland filter or Chamberland-Pasteur filter, a device that made use of an unglazed porcelain bar. The filter had pores that were smaller than bacteria, thus making it possible to pass a solution containing bacteria through the filter, and having the bacteria completely removed from the solution. Chamberland was also credited for starting a research project that led to the invention of the autoclave device in 1879.

References

External links
 
 Charles Edouard Chamberland and Louis Pasteur, PasteurBrewing.com

1908 deaths
1851 births
People from Jura (department)
French microbiologists